Sooryavanshi is a 2021 Indian Hindi-language action film written and directed by Rohit Shetty and produced by Reliance Entertainment, Rohit Shetty Picturez, Dharma Productions and Cape of Good Films. The fourth installment of Shetty's Cop Universe, it stars Akshay Kumar in the title role as ATS chief DCP Veer Sooryavanshi opposite Katrina Kaif, with Ajay Devgn and Ranveer Singh also returning as Singham and Simmba. Jackie Shroff, Gulshan Grover, Nikitin Dheer, Sikandar Kher, Abhimanyu Singh and Kumud Mishra play the antagonists while Jaaved Jaaferi, Vivan Bhatena and Niharica Raizada in supporting roles.

Kumar's character was announced towards the end of Simmba (2018) that served as a character introduction.

Sooryavanshi initially locked to release on 24 March 2020 and then 2021, it was postponed due to COVID-19 pandemic in India. After several delays, it finally released theatrically on 5 November 2021 coinciding with Diwali. The film received mixed to positive reviews from critics and went on to become the highest grossing Hindi film of 2021 and 47th highest grossing Indian film of all time with a gross of  after the COVID-19 pandemic.

Plot 
During the 1993 Mumbai blasts, Veer "Surya" Sooryavanshi loses his parents where he becomes motivated to become an ATS officer. Years later, Bilal Ahmed, the blasts' mastermind seeks refuge with dreaded terrorist Omar Hafeez at POK, as they begin planning more such attacks. Omar's son Riyaaz has formed a sleeper cell network consisting of 40 terrorists who pose as Indians, aiming to conduct more bombings after the 26/11 attacks. Surya is now the DCP and ATS chief plans an operation in Jaisalmer, where he and his team kidnap Riyaaz who was hiding his identity.

Joint CP and Surya's senior officer Kabir Shroff, who was the only person able to fully solve the case, reveals that about a full ton of RDX was brought to India, of which 400 kgs were used during the 1993 bombings and the remnant 600 kgs are still buried somewhere in the country. Surya plans to catch the sleeper cell's remaining members. He also tries to reconcile with his estranged wife Dr. Ria Gupta, with whom he parted ways due to a misunderstanding, but to no avail. Surya comes across Islamic priest Kader Usmani, in fact a terrorist and Bilal's aide. Usmani meets Bilal, whose residence in Sawantwadi houses the wanted 600 kgs of RDX. They remove the buried RDX and prepare for the next bombings. Bilal reaches Mumbai with the help of taxi driver John Mascarenhas who left for Bangkok.

Surya catches Bilal, who confesses that he undertook the bombings as an act of vengeance for his family being killed in communal riots and shoots himself to death. Later, John is apprehended in Bangkok post a long chase between him and Surya, who learns that the bombs were being made by another member of the sleeper cell. Usmani and John are arrested; Surya plans to pretend to torture Usmani's daughters to make him confess. Usmani finally reveals that Riyaaz will meet him at his aide Rafique's residence. A suicidal bomb planted there kills Usmani, whose elder daughter helps in identifying the bombmaker Mukhtar Ansari, who is hiding in Shivgarh. Surya sends Inspector Sangram "Simmba" Bhalerao to arrest him.

Simmba tells Surya that 7 bombs are to be planted at 7 locations in Mumbai. Riyaaz escapes, and it is revealed that the ATS's headquarters would also be bombed. Surya and his team enlist NSG's help to safely extradite the bombs via helicopters and the bombings get botched. However, Riyaaz and his team use Ria as a suicide bomber to attack the ATS headquarters keeping Surya, Simmba and the other cops as hostages. Surya's friend DCP Bajirao Singham arrives and they defuse the bomb wrapped around Ria while killing all the terrorists. They capture Mukhtar, Riyaaz and his younger brother Raza who taunt Singham, Simmba, and Surya that they have been in India as sleeper cells for many years, carrying several attacks in Mumbai, and that the police cannot harm them. An enraged Singham, Simmba, and Surya shoot them to death, thus bringing peace in Mumbai.

Cast

Production

Development 
Sooryavanshi was announced in December 2018 through post-credit scenes of Simmba. The first look posters featuring Akshay Kumar were unveiled in March 2019. Unlike earlier entries in the series, Sooryavanshi is not based on any existing work, but is an original story. The scripting of the film began in Goa in 2019.

Filming 
Miscellaneous work of the film commenced in February 2019 in Mumbai, where the film's teaser was shot. Shetty began filming early in the morning and were done in a couple of hours before leaving for Goa to complete the scripting stages. Principal photography commenced in Mumbai on 6 May 2019 and was planned to be shot in Mumbai, Goa, Hyderabad and Thailand. In June 2019, the recreated version of 'Tip Tip Barsa Paani' was shot in Mumbai, where choreographer Farah Khan had choreographed the song. Another schedule was shot in Hyderabad, where it was a month long schedule and majority of action sequences were filmed. The second schedule took place in Bangkok. The shooting wrapped up on 30 November 2019 in Hyderabad. The film's last schedule wrapped in December 2019 in Mumbai.

Casting 
Akshay Kumar was finalized as the main lead and it was announced during end credits of Simmba, conceiving the idea for the "Cop Universe". Shetty stated, "In Simmba, Ajay Devgn made a special appearance in his Bajirao Singham avatar, while Ranveer Singh too played a cop. Now in Sooryavanshi, both Ranveer and Ajay will be making an appearance and it will not be surprising if they reprise their respective roles from Simmba and Singham". Jacqueline Fernandez was rumored to be the female lead opposite Kumar in the film, however later in March 2019 it was confirmed that Katrina Kaif was finalised as the female lead.

Music 

The music of the film is composed by Tanishk Bagchi, Lijo George – DJ Chetas and JAM8 while lyrics are written by Rashmi Virag, Shabbir Ahmed, Anand Bakshi, Tanishk Bagchi and Prem Dhawan. The song "Aila Re Aillaa" is a recreation of the eponymous song from the 2010 film Khatta Meetha. The song "Najaa" is a remake of the 2017 Punjabi song of the same name, originally created by Pav Dharia. The song "Tip Tip Barsa Pani" is a remake of the eponymous song from the film Mohra, originally composed by Viju Shah and features the vocals of original singers Alka Yagnik and Udit Narayan. The song "Hum Hindustani" was released on 22 March 2022 under Saregama; it was adapted from the eponymous song originally composed by Usha Khanna and written by Prem Dhawan.

Release

Theatrical 
Initially announced as an Eid 2020 release, the film was rescheduled to 27 March 2020. Later, in February 2020, the makers decided to release it on 24 March 2020. However, the COVID-19 pandemic in India caused it to be postponed. In June 2020, Reliance Entertainment confirmed that Sooryavanshi will finally hit cinemas on Diwali, that is 13 November 2020, but due to theatre guidelines owing to the continuity of pandemic, the film was again put on hold as stated by the makers. In October 2020, the release was postponed to a later date, possibly between January and March 2021. In February 2021, sources confirmed that makers of Sooryavanshi have fixed 2 April 2021 as its new release date but that again failed to get materialized, because of night curfew or partial lockdown impose in Maharashtra announced by its government. After a delay of more than one year, it was declared on 14 March 2021 that the film will finally release theatrically on 30 April 2021. As of April 2021, the release date of film had been postponed indefinitely due to rise in COVID-19 cases and lockdown in Maharashtra. On 15 of October 2021, it was announced that it will be released theatrically on 5 November 2021, coinciding with Diwali

Home media 

Reception

Critical response 

Archika Khurana from The Times of India gave 3 stars out of 5 and wrote, "Rohit Shetty has tactfully expanded his Cop Universe over the years – keeping the audience engaged and die-hard fans of the genre on the edge. After the Singham series (headlined by Ajay Devgn) and then Simbaa (starring Ranveer Singh), now storms in, Sooryavanshi (Akshay Kumar), amidst much fanfare, drama, and blaring theatrics. Sooryavanshi's character was subtly announced towards the end of Simmba. The film has all the elements, attitude, style, showmanship and heavy-duty star power expected of a Rohit Shetty offering."

Anuj Kumar from The Hindu equated the film with a pandemic. He opined that the film "planted seeds of suspicion against a particular community". However, he praised the action sequences and performances of the cast. He summed up the film as, "Deepawali cracker that lights up the sky but covers the soul with soot." Taran Adarsh of Bollywood Hungama gave 4.5 stars out of 5 on Twitter and called "Fantastic" made for mass action entertainment. Writing on the website Bollywood Hungama, he further stated that: "SOORYAVANSHI has it all: stars, scale, action and entertainment. Rohit Shetty presents a Blockbuster package this Diwali."

Umesh Punwani from Koimoi gave 2 stars out of 5 and stated, "Sooryavanshi boils down to be a badly done spoof of multiple Rohit Shetty (and other similar templates) movies." Shubhra Gupta from The Indian Express gave 2 stars and called, "It is only when the trio of Akshay Kumar, Ranveer Singh and Ajay Devgn come together, the Rohit Shetty movie gives us what it promises, three for the price of one."

Nandini Ramnath of Scroll.in gave 2 out of 5 stars and said, "The gist of the 145-minute movie is contained in the extended climactic action sequence." Monika Rawal Kukreja of Hindustan Times said, "Sooryavanshi isn't driven by a great script neither does it have any extraordinary suspense that could bring nail-biting moments. Yet, it keeps you on the edge for the sheer joy of watching that over-the-top action." Saibal Chatterjee of NDTV gave the film 2.5 stars rating and wrote, "Akshay's gait is stunt in itself: a cross between a model in the middle of catwalk and a superhero about to take flight. Just like Simmba had provided a glimpse of what was to come in the next instalment, Sooryavanshi indicates what the future might hold for the Rohit Shetty cop universe."

Himesh Mankad of Pinkvilla gave the film a rating of 3 stars out of 5 and wrote, "Sooryavanshi has its share of flaws, but also has enough going in its favor to entertain the audience on the big screen. It's a vehicle driven by Akshay Kumar, who gets support from Ajay Devgn and Ranveer Singh in the finale, resulting in a Diwali Dhamaka. It's unlike any Rohit Shetty film to date, rather, among his aesthetically sound directorial, which just deserved a little better writing and editing." Pradeep Menon from Firstpost gave the film 3 out of 5 stars rating and wrote, "Sooryavanshi doubles and triples down on its Hindu-Muslim unity message every instance it gets. It is not always done with nuance or understanding of complex religious dynamics, but the intentions are clear. This is a filmmaker reacting to the times he is living in. Keeping all of that aside, Sooryavanshi is a competent action film that sticks to lane, and delivers at least as much over-the-top entertainment as it promises."

Joginder Tuteja from Rediff.com gave the film 4.5 stars out of 5 and stated, "Sooryavanshi isn't the kind of masala entertainment that many film-makers have tried to force feed the audience. It is pure big screen entertainment, something that truly works right through its near two and a half hour duration. It's remarkable to notice how there is no dull moment in this two-and-a-half hour film, showing yet again that a long movie can work if made with conviction and loads of exciting sequences, just like Manmohan Desai used to do in his films with one highlight every 10 minutes." Deccan Herald gave a rating of 2.5/5 and said, "The best part of Sooryavanshi is when Simmba Bhalerao (Ranveer Singh) and Bajirao Singham (Ajay Devgn) join Veer Sooryavanshi (Akshay Kumar) in a high-octane clash against terrorists. The final 15-20 minutes is fun as the trio revels in slick action and whacky comedy."

Among international critics, Devika Girish of The New York Times criticized the film for uncritical jingoism and said "'Sooryavanshi' is weighed down by such endless, didactic soapboxing, while the rest of this erratic film devotes itself to juvenile jokes [...] and sultry songs that offer the film's female lead, Katrina Kaif, her only meaningful screen time."

According to Indian publication The Quint, Sooryavanshi "criminalises normal Muslim behaviour" and associates "things that a large number of Indian Muslims feel, say or do in their daily life" with terrorists. Washington Post columnist Rana Ayyub said that the movie stoked "Islamophobic tropes" and compared the film to propaganda films from Nazi Germany.

Box office 
Sooryavanshi earned  at the domestic box office on its opening day. On the second day, the film collected .

It emerged as the highest-grossing Hindi films of the year by surpassing 83 (2021).

Impact 
The film was the first major release post COVID-19 pandemic era, which revived the exhibition sector for Hindi cinema. Earlier, few films including Akshay Kumar's other film Bell Bottom got limited release, though it did almost 30 crore but failed to revive. Sooryavanshi proved to be the ice breaker for the box office business in Bollywood.
Director Rohit Shetty said after the success of the film:We fought for almost 19 months, where everyone told me my decision was wrong. Even till Thursday a lot of people were like, ‘He has gone mad, nobody is going to come to theatres.’ But there was a belief that they would come. We analysed a lot of things – the Ganesh Utsav, Navratri, how schools and malls started opening up, and how people started going back to work.When all of this was happening, I knew people would come to the theatres. Someone had to take the first step. I knew I had to take the risk and now I think it was worth taking. It was not just about me but the livelihood of all those connected to the theatrical business.

References

External links 
 
 

Film spin-offs
Films about terrorism in India
Films directed by Rohit Shetty
Films postponed due to the COVID-19 pandemic
Indian films about revenge
2020s Hindi-language films
2020s masala films
Reliance Entertainment films
Cop Universe
Films about jihadism
Films about organised crime in India
Films about suicide
Fictional portrayals of the Maharashtra Police
Islamic terrorism in fiction
Films shot in Bangkok
Films shot in Goa
Films shot in Mumbai
Films set in Mumbai
Films about bomb disposal
Films based on the 2008 Mumbai attacks
1993 Bombay bombings
Films about arms trafficking
2020s chase films
Films about identity theft
Indian action films